Kiptopeke State Park is a state park located in the southern end of the Eastern Shore of Virginia and the Delmarva Peninsula in Northampton County, near Cape Charles.  From 1949, the site was owned by the Virginia Ferry Corporation and used through 1964 as the northern terminus for the Little Creek-Cape Charles Ferry service which crossed the lower Chesapeake Bay from the Eastern Shore / Delmarva to Norfolk and Hampton Roads harbor on the Western Shore. In 1964, the ferry service was replaced by the Chesapeake Bay Bridge-Tunnel which opened up giving automobile traffic convenient access to the park, the Cape, Delmarva and "The Shore" to the urban centers to the west in North Carolina, Virginia, Maryland and the District of Columbia.

The state park has a number of recreational amenities, including "yurts" which are half tent, half cabin. The park also offers recreational access to the brackish waters of the Chesapeake Bay with its shoreline and beach plus piers as well as an opportunity to explore unique migratory bird habitat along the East Coast flyway. It also has 5 new sunfilled cabins that sleep up to 16 people, RV and tent camping, group camping and camping trailers. For the fisherman it also has a number of boat launching ramps and lighted fishing piers. Access to shopping for supplies is available in the commercial district of the nearby town of Cape Charles.

References
Park website

State parks of Virginia
Parks in Northampton County, Virginia
Protected areas established in 1992
1992 establishments in Virginia
Beaches of Virginia